Tough Love: Best of the Ballads is a 2011 compilation album by Aerosmith. The album was announced on March 30, 2011, and was released on Geffen Records on May 10, 2011.

Track listing

US version

UK version

Personnel
Steven Tyler - lead vocals, harmonica, piano
Tom Hamilton - bass
Joey Kramer - drums
Joe Perry - lead guitar, backing vocals, pedal steel guitar
Brad Whitford - rhythm guitar, acoustic guitar

Release history

Charts

References 

2011 greatest hits albums
Aerosmith compilation albums
Geffen Records compilation albums